Blue's is the fourth studio album by Italian singer-songwriter Zucchero Fornaciari. It was released on 15 June 1987, with Fornaciari credited as "Zucchero Sugar Fornaciari". The album sold over 1.3 million copies.
 
The success that Zucchero had experienced at music festivals in the early 1980s, including several appearances at the Sanremo Music Festival, eventually attracted the attention of foreign musicians. After travelling to the United States in the mid-1980s, he returned with a new band including some American musicians and a focus on the blues. Among them was keyboardist David Sancious. The tour following the release of the album included performances featuring Joe Cocker, Miles Davis, Eric Clapton, and B. B. King. The album elevated Zucchero's reputation internationally

It became the best-selling album internationally by an Italian musician until it was overtaken by Zucchero's subsequent studio album Oro Incenso & Birra in 1989.

Track listing

Personnel
Zucchero – vocals, piano
Giorgio Francis – drums
Rosario Jermano – percussions
Polo Jones – bass
Corrado Rustici – guitar
David Sancious – keyboards
Wayne Jackson – trombone, trumpet
Andrew Love – saxophone
Clarence Clemons – saxophone
Eric Daniel – saxophone
James Thompson, Aida Cooper, Arthur Miles, Simona Pirone, Coro di Voci Maschili della Chiesa Avventista – backing vocals
John Etchells – sound engineer

References

1987 albums
Zucchero Fornaciari albums
Italian-language albums